Johnny Rønne Jensen (born 16 November 1974) is a Danish former competitive figure skater. He is the 1996 Piruetten silver medalist, a three-time Nordic champion, and a three-time Danish national champion. He competed at three European Championships, achieving his best result in 1999.

Competitive highlights

References 

1974 births
Danish male single skaters
Living people
Sportspeople from Copenhagen
Competitors at the 1997 Winter Universiade